Elachista amideta is a moth of the family Elachistidae. It is found in Canada, where it has been recorded from Ontario.

The wingspan is about 9.2 mm. The forewing have white scales with pale grey tips, giving the wing a pale grey appearance. The costal area is somewhat darker than the remainder of the wing. Darker and grey-tipped scales form indistinct longitudinal lines on the wing.

References

amideta
Moths described in 1948
Moths of North America